The 1987 Big East men's basketball tournament took place at Madison Square Garden in New York City, from March 5 to March 8, 1987. Its winner received the Big East Conference's automatic bid to the 1987 NCAA tournament. It is a single-elimination tournament with four rounds.  Georgetown had the best regular season conference record and received the #1 seed.

Georgetown defeated Syracuse in the championship game 69–59, to claim its fifth Big East tournament championship.

Bracket

Games

Final

Awards
Most Valuable Player: Reggie Williams, Georgetown

All Tournament Team
 Billy Donovan, Providence
 Sherman Douglas, Syracuse
 Jerome Lane, Pittsburgh
 Rony Seikaly, Syracuse
 Reggie Williams, Georgetown

References

External links
 

Tournament
Big East men's basketball tournament
Basketball in New York City
College sports in New York City
Sports competitions in New York City
Sports in Manhattan
Big East men's basketball tournament
Big East men's basketball tournament
1980s in Manhattan
Madison Square Garden